is a mountain located in Hyōgo and Tottori Prefectures with an altitude of . It has been selected as one of the 100 famous mountains in Kansai and 300 famous mountains in Japan.

It is one of the representative volcanoes in the Kansai region and there are Yumura hot springs and Iwai hot springs at the foot of the mountain. It is also one of the most popular mountain skiing destinations in western Japan.

References 

Mountains of Hyōgo Prefecture
Mountains of Tottori Prefecture